Iosco County is a county in the U.S. state of Michigan; its eastern border is formed by Lake Huron. As of the 2010 census, the population was 25,237. The county seat is Tawas City.

Etymology of Iosco
Iosco has traditionally been said to be a Native American word meaning "water of light", but was actually coined as a pseudo-Native American name by Henry Rowe Schoolcraft, an American geographer and ethnologist who served as the U.S. Indian agent in Michigan in the late 19th century. He named several counties and towns during the state's formative years.

History

The county was created by the Michigan Legislature in 1840 as Kanotin County, and renamed Iosco County in 1843. It was administered by a succession of other Michigan counties before the organization of county government in 1857. A majority of the population was Ojibwe. The area offered shelter from tall white pines and food from the river and lake. Iosco County was cut from a piece of land ceded by the Ojibwe to the U.S. government. When the lumber boom hit, many more people moved to the area.

The 400-acre Alabaster Historic District, listed on the National Register of Historic Places, is associated with an operating gypsum open-pit mine south of Tawas City. The large company town included internal rail lines for transportation and a tramway extending over Lake Huron on long piers for loading gypsum onto ships. Started in 1862, the mine supplied gypsum for temporary buildings constructed in Chicago at the World Columbian Exposition of 1893. Two companies continue to mine gypsum in Iosco County.

In 2009, Alabaster Township formed the nonprofit Alabaster Wind Power Development Corp. to conduct the necessary two-year studies of wind data at this site as a potential location for development of wind turbines. It proposed using 10 large tramway platforms that extend more than 6,000 feet into the lake to gauge winds. The turbines could be built on the tramways. At the time, the federal government was offering subsidies for such studies and development of alternative energy projects.

Geography
It is considered part of Northern Michigan. In total, it covers about 6,361,837 acres.

Geographic features
Lumberman's Monument 
Canoer's memorial
60 Lakes Area - Located near Hale 
Iargo Springs
Tawas Point Light House - First lit in 1853
Tawas Bay
Au Sable River
Tuttle Marsh Wildlife Area
Van Etten Lake
Tawas Lake
Foote Dam Pond
Au Sable State Forest (partial) – the Grayling Fire Management Unit consists of Alcona, Crawford, and Oscoda Counties, and northern Iosco county.

Major highways
 – known as the Sunrise Side Coastal Highway.
 – one of three cross-peninsular state highways. It begins in Tawas City at the junction with US 23.

River Road National Scenic Byway – starts at M-65 and runs parallel with the Au Sable River for  eastward to US 23 in Oscoda, Michigan. It is a designated National Scenic Byway. It passes the Lumberman's Monument.

Adjacent counties
By land
Alcona County - north
Arenac County - southwest
Ogemaw County - west
Oscoda County - northwest
By water
Huron County - southeast

National protected area
 Huron National Forest (part)

Demographics

As of the 2000 United States Census, there were 27,339 people, 11,727 households, and 7,857 families in the county. Most of the population is located on the shoreline along US-23,East Tawas, Tawas City, and Oscoda County. The population density was 50 people per square mile (19/km2). There were 20,432 housing units at an average density of 37 per square mile (14/km2). The county's racial makeup was 96.92% White, 0.41% Black or African American, 0.66% Native American, 0.46% Asian, 0.05% Pacific Islander, 0.23% from other races, and 1.27% from two or more races.  0.98% of the population were Hispanic or Latino of any race. 23.2% were of German, 12.3% English, 10.6% Irish, 9.9% American, 8.3% Polish and 7.1% French ancestry. 97.4% spoke English and 1.0% Spanish as their first language.

There were 11,727 households, out of which 24.90% had children under the age of 18 living with them, 55.20% were married couples living together, 8.40% had a female householder with no husband present, and 33.00% were non-families. 28.60% of all households were made up of individuals, and 14.00% had someone living alone who was 65 years of age or older. The average household size was 2.30 and the average family size was 2.79.

The county population included 22.40% under the age of 18, 5.40% from 18 to 24, 23.40% from 25 to 44, 27.30% from 45 to 64, and 21.60% who were 65 years of age or older. The median age was 44 years. For every 100 females there were 96.30 males. For every 100 females age 18 and over, there were 93.60 males.

The median income for a household in the county was $31,321, and the median income for a family was $37,452. Males had a median income of $30,338 versus $21,149 for females. The per capita income for the county was $17,115.  About 9.50% of families and 12.70% of the population were below the poverty line, including 18.50% of those under age 18 and 7.60% of those age 65 or over.

Government
The county government operates the jail, maintains rural roads, operates the major local courts, records deeds, mortgages, and vital records, administers public health regulations, and participates with the state in the provision of social services. The county board of commissioners controls the budget, with limited authority to make laws or ordinances. In Michigan, most local government functions—police and fire, building and zoning tax assessment, street maintenance, etc.—are the responsibility of individual cities and townships.

Elected officials
Iosco County has been reliably Republican from the beginning. Since 1884, the Republican presidential nominee has carried the county in 27 of 35 elections.

County elected officials
 Prosecuting Attorney: James Bacarella
 Sheriff: Scott D. Frank
 County Clerk: Nancy J. Huebel    
 County Treasurer: Cathy Anderson
 Register of Deeds: Ericka Earl
 Drain Commissioner: Fred Strauer

County commissioners
 District 1: Robert Huebel III
 District 2: Terry Dutcher
 District 3: Charles Finley
 District 4: John Moehring
 District 5: Donald "Jay" O'Farrell

Education
Iosco County has four public school districts:
Hale Area Schools
Oscoda Area Schools
Tawas Area Schools
Whittemore-Prescott Area Schools

There are also three private elementary schools:
Emanuel Lutheran School (Tawas City)
Holy Family School (East Tawas)
Shady Grove School (Whittemore)

Alpena Community College offers college-level courses at its campus on the former Wurtsmith Air Force Base in Oscoda and local public school facilities.

Media
The Iosco County News-Herald is the newspaper of record for Iosco County.
The Oscoda Press is a weekly newspaper serving northern Iosco County and southern Alcona County.

Communities

Cities
 East Tawas
 Tawas City (county seat)
 Whittemore

Charter townships
 Au Sable Charter Township
 Oscoda Charter Township

Civil townships

 Alabaster Township
 Baldwin Township
 Burleigh Township
 Grant Township
 Plainfield Township
 Reno Township
 Sherman Township
 Tawas Township
 Wilber Township

Census-designated places
 Au Sable
 Oscoda
 Sand Lake

Other unincorporated communities
 Hale
 Long Lake
 National City

See also
 List of Michigan State Historic Sites in Iosco County, Michigan
National Register of Historic Places listings in Iosco County, Michigan

References

Further reading

External links

 
 County of Iosco, links, media, history, parks, and services
 Enchanted forest, Northern Michigan source for information, calendars, etc.
 Iosco County website

 
Michigan counties
1857 establishments in Michigan
Populated places established in 1857